Are you happy now? is the third major album of artist Aya Kamiki, released on September 10, 2008. The album debuted at number 10 on the Oricon Weekly Chart, number 6 on the Oricon Daily Chart.

CD track listing

Cover
Aika Ohno , the composer of Kimi Sarishi Yuuwaku, covered the song in her cover album Silent Passage.

DVD track listing
Music Video DVD

SUNDAY MORNING (Making Of)
SUNDAY MORNING (Music Video)
Kimi Sarishi Yuuwaku (Making Of)
Kimi Sarishi Yuuwaku (Music Video)
Summer Memories (Making Of)
Summer Memories (Music Video)

Live DVD

Nemutteita Kimochi Nemutteita Kokoro
Secret Code
Pierrot 
Mō Kimi Dake o Hanashitari wa Shinai
Ashita no Tame ni

Song Placement In Other Media
"Are you happy now?" was the Japan Countdown opening theme, MU-GEN ending theme and Jouhou Paradise ending theme for September.

Albums sales

References

2008 albums
Aya Kamiki albums
Being Inc. albums
Giza Studio albums
Albums produced by Daiko Nagato